The Quilters' Guild Museum Collection, which opened in St Anthony's Hall, York on 7 June 2008, was Britain's first museum dedicated to the history of British quilt making and textile arts. The museum was founded and operated by The Quilters' Guild of the British Isles. The Guild was formed in 1979 and is the national organisation representing quilt makers throughout the country. Traditional and contemporary work is of equal importance within the Guild, and membership is open to anyone who works in patchwork, appliqué, and quilting, or has an interest in quilts.

The Quilt Museum Gallery closed on 31 October 2015 but the Collection can be viewed on specific days free of charge. Details can be found on the Museum Collection website.

The Quilters’ Guild continues to care for its Collection of historic and contemporary quilts and to make acquisitions. The Museum Collection is open free of charge to members of the public on specific dates which can be found at https://www.quiltmuseum.org.uk. The Guild continues to explore a wide range of opportunities for items from the Collection to be exhibited in other locations.

See also 
 Museum of the American Quilter's Society

References

External links
 Quilt Museum official website
 Quilters' Guild of the British Isles official website

Museums in York
Textile museums in the United Kingdom
Quilt museums
Art museums established in 2008
Art museums and galleries in North Yorkshire
2008 establishments in England